Sun and Steel may refer to:

 Sun and Steel (album), a 1975 album by Iron Butterfly
 Sun and Steel (essay), a 1970 essay by Yukio Mishima
 A song by Iron Maiden from their 1983 album Piece of Mind
 A phrase used frequently by Bronze Age Pervert to describe his ideal lifestyle